The Archbishop Lanfranc Academy is a coeducational secondary school located in the Thornton Heath area of Croydon, South London, named after Lanfranc, Archbishop of Canterbury from 1070 to 1089.

History
The school was founded in 1931 as a boys' school in Thornton Road, Thornton Heath, near the junction with Mitcham Road and is close to Mitcham Common. In 1953 work began on a new school nearby in Mitcham Road, being opened in 1956 by the then Archbishop of Canterbury, Geoffrey Fisher.

On 9 August 1961, 34 boys and 2 members of staff from the school were killed when their plane crashed near Stavanger Airport, Sola, Norway. The fiftieth anniversary was marked by a book published in summer 2011, The Lanfranc Boys by Rosalind Jones, sister of Quentin Green, one of the victims.

The school converted from secondary modern status to comprehensive in 1970, merging at the same time with the girl's school of the same name. It became a comprehensive foundation school in 1998, administered by Croydon London Borough Council. The Archbishop Lanfranc School converted to academy status in September 2014 and was renamed The Archbishop Lanfranc Academy. However, the school continues to coordinate with Croydon London Borough Council for admissions.

The Archbishop Lanfranc Academy featured in the 2014 fly-on-the-wall documentary, Tough Young Teachers.

Description
The Ofsted report of June 2009 states that the school "is a specialist sports college serving a part of Croydon of considerable ethnic and cultural diversity. The school is average in size and has a significantly higher proportion of boys than girls. The proportion of pupils who have learning difficulties and/or disabilities, including those with a statement of special educational need, is above average. The school holds several national and local awards including the National Association for Able Children in Education (NACE) Award and the Investors in People standard." There is a Nursery overseen by the governing body, and judgements about its effectiveness were included in this report. The privately run Lanfranc Pre-school was inspected and reported on separately. The report stated that the quality of education provided by the school was at least satisfactory in all respects with some key aspects as good and others outstanding.

Notable former pupils
Paul Oakenfold, record producer, DJ, remixer
Wayne Alexander, boxer
Hannah Barrett, The X Factor 2013 contestant, 2007–2012
Wayne Routledge, footballer, 1996–2001 
Moses Swaibu, footballer, 2000-2005
Fuse ODG, rapper, 1999–2004
Jermaine McGlashan, footballer 2007–present
Carmaine Walker, England footballer, 2003–2004
Stuart Humphryes, film and video colouriser, 1981–1986
Dale Jasper, footballer

Headteachers
James Harper (?–1977
Ronald Blackman (?–1983)
Robert Pope (1983–1994)
David Clark (1994–2014)
Michael del Río (2014–2021)
Simon Trehearn (2021–Present)

References

External links

Secondary schools in the London Borough of Croydon
Educational institutions established in 1931
1931 establishments in England
Academies in the London Borough of Croydon
Thornton Heath